Hillevi Maria Engström (née Pettersson; born 15 April 1963 in Sollentuna) is a Swedish former politician who served as Minister for Employment from 2010 to 2013 and as Minister for International Development Cooperation from 2013 to 2014. A member of the Moderate Party, she served as a Member of the Swedish Riksdag from 2002 to 2015. 

Prior to political engaged she worked as a police inspector and was in the year of 1995 walking delegate of the Swedish Police Union, the first woman to do so. She is the sister of the Swedish journalist and presenter Karin Hübinette. 

Since 1 March 2015, Engström has served as chief director of Upplands Väsby Municipality.

References

External links 

Hillevi Engström at the Riksdag website
Hillevi Engström at the Government's website
Hillevi Engström: more social responsibility needed in working life.

1963 births
Living people
21st-century Swedish women politicians
Members of the Riksdag 2002–2006
Members of the Riksdag from the Moderate Party
People from Sollentuna Municipality
Swedish Ministers for Employment
Swedish Ministers for International Development Cooperation
Women government ministers of Sweden
Women members of the Riksdag